Kadanthodu ( ka-den-thode ) (also "Kadanthottu")is the surname used by members of the Kadanthodu Family who originate from the town of Changanacherry in the State of Kerala in India. It is a name written in Malayalam, the official language of the State of Kerala. (The version shown here is its anglicized form.)

Origins
The Kadanthodu family traces its roots to the ancient Kulathackal Family of the Raman Namboodiris (Brahmins) of Maramon Town in Kerala, India, who had embraced Christianity in AD 1325. (?) These Namboodiri-Christians came to be known as the Ramachans of Maramon and Aranmoolla.

According to folklore, the name "Ramachan" is derived from the honorific granted to one Mr. Raman Namboodiri by the native Hindu ruler who was also the patron and benefactor of the Temple. The ruler had been unhappy for some time because the financial affairs and journals of the temple had not been kept up to date, and the accounts were seriously in arrears. The ruler assigned the accounting burden to Raman Namboodiri, who, working diligently over a single night, managed to reconcile all of the temple's accounts and bring the books current. Pleased at this remarkable feat, and at the speed with which Raman managed to complete his assignment, the ruler honored Raman by granting him the title "Ramachan," meaning the "One who is better than or superior to even the Night." ("Ra" is from "Ratri" in Sanskrit meaning "Night." Many of his descendants continue to carry the name Ramachan as their surname even today).

The accounting feat demonstrated by Ramachan did not sit well with his fellow Brahmins of the temple who had personally benefited by manipulating those accounts. Ramachan became persona non grata in his own town; life became difficult for him and his family. At this time, Ramachan came to befriend a neighbor, Malliyekal Tharakan, who was a Christian.

Christianity in Kerala
Christianity has existed in India for nearly two thousand years. It is believed that the Apostle Saint Thomas himself arrived in Kerala in AD 52 via trade routes from Arabia. He preached the gospel there, founded seven churches, and evangelized many natives to Christianity. He is said to have been martyred in India in AD 72.)

Ramachan became interested in studying Christian philosophy. A moment of epiphany guided Ramachan later to go with his neighbor to the Church at Nirannam (one of the seven churches of Saint Thomas), where he was baptized and became a Christian in AD 1325 (?)

Kadanthodu in Modern Times
Over time, some members of his family migrated to the town of Changanacherry and its surrounding areas in Kerala and founded the great Kadanthodu Family. Part of this family is now residing in Allepey, Kanjirapally areas and rest in Changanacherry. The family is scattered throughout the world.

Indian surnames